Big Man, Little Love is a 2001 international co-production drama film, written and directed by Handan İpekçi, about an orphaned Kurdish child and a Turkish pensioner thrown together by circumstance.

Plot
An orphaned Kurdish child (Hêjar) and a Turkish pensioner (Rıfat) are thrown together by circumstance. Rıfat, a widowed retired judge, refuses to get involved in politics. He is forced out of his solitude, when Hêjar the only survivor of a police raid on his Kurdish neighbors, takes refuge at his home. Gradually, he warms up to the kid and decides to reunite her with her family.

Cast
Şükran Güngör as  Rıfat Bey
Dilan Erçetin as Hêjar
Füsun Demirel as Sakine
Yıldız Kenter as Müzeyyen Hanım
İsmail Hakkı Şen as  Evdo Emmi

Awards
 Golden Orange & Special Jury Awards (Best Film, Best Screenplay, Best Supporting Actor & Actress), Antalya Golden Orange Film Festival, 2001.
 Silver Pyramid Award, Cairo International Film Festival, 2002.
 Best Screenplay Award, Cologne Mediterranean Film Festival, 2002.
 People's Choice Award, Istanbul International Film Festival, 2003.

External links

Hejar, Reviewed by Neil Smith, BBC, Jan. 2003.

2001 drama films
2001 films
Turkish drama films
Films about race and ethnicity
Films set in Turkey
Films shot in Turkey
Golden Orange Award for Best Film winners
Hungarian drama films
Greek drama films
2000s Turkish-language films
Kurdish-language films